Andre Agassi won in the final 6–2, 6–4 against Paul Annacone.

Seeds
A champion seed is indicated in bold text while text in italics indicates the round in which that seed was eliminated.

  Ivan Lendl (second round)
  Andre Agassi (champion)
  Brad Gilbert (first round)
  Amos Mansdorf (second round)
  Aaron Krickstein (third round)
  David Pate (second round)
  Peter Lundgren (third round)
  Eliot Teltscher (first round)
  Darren Cahill (semifinals)
  Jay Berger (quarterfinals)
  Christo van Rensburg (first round)
  Dan Goldie (semifinals)
  Paul Annacone (final)
  John Frawley (second round)
  Jim Grabb (first round)
  Jim Pugh (third round)

Draw

Finals

Top half

Section 1

Section 2

Bottom half

Section 3

Section 4

References
 1988 Volvo International Draw (Archived 2009-06-09)

Singles